Aghcheh (also Romanized as Āghche, Ākhche, Āghcha, Ākhcha, or Ākhchia) is a village in Yeylaq Rural District, in the Central District of Buin va Miandasht County, Isfahan Province, Iran. At the 2006 census, its population was 995, in 223 families.

References 

Populated places in Buin va Miandasht County